Elisabeth Bonetsmüller (26 March 1907 – 15 May 1987) was a German athlete. She competed in the women's high jump at the 1928 Summer Olympics.

References

External links
 

1907 births
1987 deaths
Athletes (track and field) at the 1928 Summer Olympics
German female high jumpers
Olympic athletes of Germany
Place of birth missing